Hills and mountains named Guyot, after geologist Arnold Guyot (1807–1884):

 Mount Guyot (Great Smoky Mountains), on the Tennessee/North Carolina border
 Mount Guyot (New Hampshire)
 Mount Guyot (California)
 Mount Guyot (Colorado)
 Guyot Hill (Colorado)
 Guyot Hill (New York)

External links 
  USGS GNIS: "Guyot", summit